Turbine was the name of at least three ships of the Italian Navy and may refer to:

 , a  launched in 1901 and sunk in 1915.
 , a  launched in 1904 as Espero and renamed Turbine in 1921. She was discarded in 1923.
 , a  launched in 1927 and taken over by the Kriegsmarine as TA14 in 1943, she was sunk in 1944.

Italian Navy ship names